Lirobarleeia gradata is a species of minute sea snail, a marine gastropod mollusk or micromollusk in the family Rissoidae.

Description

Distribution

References

External links
 Orbigny A. d'. (1841-1853). Mollusques. In: R. de la Sagra (ed.). Histoire physique, politique et naturelle de l'Ile de Cuba. Arthus Bertrand, Paris. Vol 1: 1-264 [pp. 1-240, pls 1-10?, 1841; 241-264, 1842; Vol. 2: 1-380 [pp. 1-112, pls 10-21?, 1842; 113-128, 1844; 129-224, pls 22-25?, 1847; 225-380, pls 26-28, 1853 ]

Rissoidae
Gastropods described in 1842